Giuseppe Lazzarotto KC*HS (born 24 May 1942) is an Italian prelate of the Catholic Church who worked in the diplomatic service of the Holy See from 1971 to 2017, with the rank of apostolic nuncio and an archbishop since 1994.

Biography
Giuseppe Lazzarotto was born in Carpanè, Vicenza, Italy, on 24 May 1942. He studied for the priesthood and was ordained a priest of the Diocese of Padua on 1 April 1967. He completed the program of study at the Pontifical Ecclesiastical Academy in 1967 and earned a doctorate in canon law. He entered the diplomatic service of the Holy See in 1971.

Lazzarotto served as part of the delegations in Zambia and Malawi, Belgium, Cuba, and Jerusalem, and in the Section for Relations with States of the Secretariat of State of the Holy See from 1984 to 1994. He was appointed Apostolic Nuncio to the Hashemite Kingdom of Jordan and to Iraq on 23 July 1994 and appointed Titular Archbishop of Numana. He was consecrated bishop on 7 October 1994 by Cardinal Angelo Sodano assisted by Archbishop Miroslav Stefan Marusyn and Bishop Antonio Mattiazzo.

He was appointed Apostolic Nuncio to Ireland on 11 November 2000. He presented his credentials to President Mary McAleese on 18 January 2001.

In 2007 a questionnaire about prospective candidates for bishop that Lazzarotto had sent to priests in the Down and Connor Diocese became public. Lazzarotto refused to comment about it saying that "all aspects relating to the process of episcopal appointments should be dealt with in the strictest confidentiality. I trust that you will understand that I cannot depart from this practice".

On 22 December 2007, Pope Benedict XVI named him Apostolic Nuncio to Australia.

The Murphy Report into child abuse in the Dublin archdiocese, released in November 2009, criticized Lazzarotto for failing to respond to a request for documents. His refusal was part of an ongoing dispute between the Irish investigators and the Holy See. The Vatican insisted on communication through the Irish Ministry of Foreign Affairs while the Commission viewed itself as independent of the government and not confined to diplomatic channels.

On 18 August 2012, Pope Benedict appointed him apostolic nuncio to Israel and apostolic delegate to Jerusalem and Palestine, to which he added the responsibilities of apostolic nuncio to Cyprus on 30 August.

He retired from the diplomatic service in August 2017. On 4 October, Pope Francis named him a member of the Congregation for the Evangelization of Peoples. At the end of 2017, he was appointed Assessor of the Order of the Holy Sepulchre by its Grand Master, Cardinal Edwin O'Brien. He resigned that position for health reasons in 2019.

See also
 List of heads of the diplomatic missions of the Holy See

References

External links

 

1942 births
People from the Province of Vicenza
Apostolic Nuncios to Israel
Apostolic Nuncios to Ireland
Apostolic Nuncios to Australia
Apostolic Nuncios to Iraq
Apostolic Nuncios to Jordan
Apostolic Nuncios to Cyprus
20th-century Italian Roman Catholic titular archbishops
Living people
Pontifical Ecclesiastical Academy alumni
Members of the Congregation for the Evangelization of Peoples
21st-century Italian Roman Catholic titular archbishops